Emmanuel "Manu" Apeh (born 25 October 1996) is a Nigerian footballer who plays as a striker for Azeri club Sabah.

Club career
Born in Kaduna, Apeh was a SamVic Academy youth graduate, and had a failed trial at Inter Milan in August 2014. He made his senior debut with RSD Alcalá's reserve team in 2015, in the regional leagues.

Apeh made his first team debut on 24 March 2016, coming on as a half-time substitute in a 1–5 Tercera División away loss against CD San Fernando de Henares. Three days later he scored his first goal, netting the last in a 2–0 home win against AD Parla.

In July 2016, after scoring four goals in nine matches, Apeh was definitely promoted to Alcalá's main squad; however, he subsequently moved to Lorca FC's B-team also in the fourth division. He made his first team debut for the latter on 17 September, replacing Manuel Onwu in a 1–0 away win against Granada CF B in the Segunda División B championship.

In April 2017, ahead of a match against Linares Deportivo, Apeh opted not to tell his father's death to his club, and still travelled and played with the senior and the reserve squads. In August, after his team's promotion to Segunda División, he was definitely promoted to the main squad by new manager Curro Torres.

Apeh made his professional debut on 18 August 2017, coming on as a late substitute for Manel Martínez in a 2–0 home win against Cultural y Deportiva Leonesa; he also provided the assist for Carlos Martínez's last goal. He scored his first professional goal on 21 October, netting his team's second in a 2–2 home draw against CD Tenerife.

On 11 July 2018, Apeh joined Celta de Vigo B in the third division. He made his first team – and La Liga – debut the following 27 January, replacing Jozabed in a 1–2 away loss against Real Valladolid.

On 5 August 2020, Apeh agreed to a three-year deal with CD Tenerife in the second level. On 26 January 2022, after being rarely used during the first half of the campaign, he moved on loan to fellow league team AD Alcorcón until June.

On 18 July 2022, Sabah announced the signing of Apeh to a two-year contract.

References

External links

1996 births
Living people
Sportspeople from Kaduna
Nigerian footballers
Association football forwards
La Liga players
Segunda División players
Segunda División B players
Tercera División players
Divisiones Regionales de Fútbol players
RSD Alcalá players
Lorca FC players
Celta de Vigo B players
RC Celta de Vigo players
CD Tenerife players
AD Alcorcón footballers
Nigerian expatriate footballers
Nigerian expatriate sportspeople in Spain
Expatriate footballers in Spain